The Tour of Qinghai Lake is an annual professional road bicycle racing stage race held in the Qinghai province of China since 2002, named after Qinghai Lake. The race is sanctioned by the International Cycling Union (UCI) as a 2.HC race as part of the UCI Asia Tour. The race was to become part of the new UCI ProSeries in 2020, although the event in 2020 was cancelled due to the COVID-19 pandemic.  The 2021 event was held as a class 2.2 race with all domestic teams due to the international travel restrictions during the pandemic.

Past winners

General classification

Notes

References

External links
 
 
 Statistics at the-sports.org
 Tour of Qinghai Lake at cqranking.com

 
Cycle races in China
UCI Asia Tour races
Recurring sporting events established in 2002
2002 establishments in China
Summer events in China